Scopula harteni is a moth of the  family Geometridae. It is found in Oman and the United Arab Emirates.

References

Moths described in 2009
harteni
Moths of Asia